Showoff is a pop punk band from Chicago, Illinois led by vocalist Chris Envy.

History
Showoff was formed in 1997 in Villa Park, Illinois. The band consisted of Chris Envy, Daniel Castady (drums), Graham Jordan (guitar), and Dave Envy (a.k.a. Dave Hyde) (bass).  In 1998, Showoff signed with Maverick Records while it was owned by Madonna. Their self-titled debut album was released the following year in 1999, and was produced by Goldfinger's John Feldmann. The single "Falling Star" reached No. 36 on the Billboard Modern Rock charts that same year. Their song "Spill" was included in the soundtrack for Digimon: The Movie, which was released in 2000. They held a one-off reunion show in March 2005 for a cancer benefit.

Discography

References

External links

Musical groups from Chicago
Pop punk groups from Illinois